Karolina Kedzierska (born 14 September 1987 in Malmö) is a Swedish female Taekwondo practitioner. She started to learn taekwondo 1997. Kedzierska competed at 2008 Summer Olympics, where she lost to Natália Falavigna of Brazil in the Bronze Medal match.

Kedzierska lives in Malmö and competes for GAK Enighet.

References

External links
Official website

Olympic taekwondo practitioners of Sweden
1987 births
Living people
Taekwondo practitioners at the 2008 Summer Olympics
Swedish female taekwondo practitioners
European Taekwondo Championships medalists
Sportspeople from Malmö
21st-century Swedish women